Marcus Rush (born June 19, 1991) is an American football linebacker who is currently a free agent. He played college football at Michigan State. He was signed by the San Francisco 49ers as an undrafted free agent following the 2015 NFL Draft.

Early years
Rush attended Moeller High School where he was rated among the nation's top defensive ends by Scouts, Inc. (#55), Scout.com (#60), and Max Emfinger (#74). He was also named to Super Prep and PrepStars All-Midwest teams. He was ranked among Ohio's top seniors by Rivals.com (#36) as well as Scout.com (#44).

As a sophomore in 2007, he appeared in eight games and recorded 16 tackles. In 2008, as a junior, he recorded 75 tackles, nine sacks, and two fumble recoveries. For the season, he was named second-team All-Conference. In 2009, as a senior, he finished second on the team in tackles. He recorded 70 tackles (35 solo), 15.5 tackles-for-loss, 11 sacks, four quarterback hurries, four passes defensed, two blocked kicks, and two interceptions. He was named the Great Catholic League South Co-Athlete of the Year after leading the conference in sacks (11) as a senior.

College career
Rush attended Michigan State University, majoring in advertising. In 2010, he redshirt his freshman season. In 2011, as a redshirt freshman, he started all 14 games at defensive end. He recorded 58 tackles, 12 tackles-for-loss, four sacks, five passes defensed, and one forced fumble. For the season, he was named Big Ten Defensive Most Valuable Player (MVP) by ESPN.com, All-Big Ten honorable mention by the coaches and media, first-team Freshman All-American by the Football Writers Association of America (FWAA), Sporting News, and second-team Freshman All-American by Yahoo! Sports, Phil Steele, and CollegeFootballNews.com. He was also named to ESPN.com, Yahoo! Sports, and BTN.com Big Ten All-Freshman team.

As a redshirt sophomore in 2012, he started all 13 games. He  recorded 38 tackles (19 solo), 7.5 tackles-for-loss, two sacks, five quarterback hurries, one forced fumble, and five passes defensed. He was named All-Big Ten honorable mention by the coaches and media. In 2013 as a redshirt junior, he started 13-of-14 games. He recorded 30 tackles, 7.5 tackles-for-loss, and five sacks. He was named All-Big Ten honorable mention by the coaches and media. In 2014, as a redshirt senior, he started all 13 games. He recorded 37 tackles, 10.5 tackles-for-loss, and 7.5 sacks. He was named All-Big Ten honorable mention by the coaches and media. He was a co-winner of the team's Downtown Coaches Club Award for outstanding senior on defense. He also won the President's Award.

Professional career

San Francisco 49ers
After going undrafted in the 2015 NFL Draft, Rush was signed by the San Francisco 49ers on May 5. He was released during final cuts on September 5 and was signed to the practice squad the next day. After spending his entire rookie season on the practice squad, he signed a reserve/future contract with the 49ers on January 6, 2016.

During the 2016 preseason, Rush led the league in sacks with six. Despite a strong preseason, he was again released by the 49ers during final roster cuts and was signed to the practice squad the next day.

Jacksonville Jaguars
On December 20, 2016, Rush was signed by the Jacksonville Jaguars off the 49ers' practice squad. On May 9, 2017, Rush was waived by the Jaguars.

Kansas City Chiefs
On May 30, 2017, Rush was signed by the Kansas City Chiefs. He was waived on September 2, 2017 and was signed to the Chiefs' practice squad the next day. He was released on October 11, 2017.

Denver Broncos
On December 20, 2017, Rush was signed to the Denver Broncos' practice squad. He signed a reserve/future contract with the Broncos on January 1, 2018.

On September 1, 2018, Rush was waived by the Broncos.

References

External links
 Michigan State bio

1991 births
Living people
Players of American football from Cincinnati
American football defensive ends
American football linebackers
Michigan State Spartans football players
San Francisco 49ers players
Jacksonville Jaguars players
Kansas City Chiefs players
Denver Broncos players